Léo Pétrot (born 15 April 1997) is a French professional footballer who plays as a left-back for  club Saint-Étienne.

Career
A youth product of US Monistrol, Olympique Saint-Etienne, and Saint-Étienne, Pétrot began his senior career with the reserves of Saint-Étienne. He thereafter moved to the senior team of Andrézieux. On 16 July 2021, he signed a professional contract with FC Lorient. He made his professional debut with Lorient in a 2–2 Ligue 1 tie with RC Lens on 29 August 2021.

On 30 August 2022, Pétrot returned to his youth club Saint-Étienne and signed a three-year contract.

References

External links
 

1997 births
Living people
People from Firminy
French footballers
Association football fullbacks
AS Saint-Étienne players
FC Lorient players
Ligue 1 players
Ligue 2 players
Championnat National 2 players
Championnat National 3 players
Sportspeople from Loire (department)
Footballers from Auvergne-Rhône-Alpes